Hard Rain Don't Last is the debut album by American country music singer Darryl Worley. It was released on July 18, 2000 via DreamWorks Records. The tracks "When You Need My Love", "A Good Day to Run", "Second Wind" and "Sideways" were all released as singles from this album. While the first three singles all reached Top 20 on the Hot Country Songs charts, "Sideways" peaked at #41.

Critical reception
Billboard magazine called "A Good Day to Run" a "free-wheeling, light-spirited cut" and a "strong single."

Track listing

Personnel
Eddie Bayers – drums
Larry Beaird – acoustic guitar
Ron Block – banjo
J. T. Corenflos – electric guitar
Melodie Crittenden – background vocals
Glen Duncan – fiddle, mandolin
Paul Franklin – steel guitar, dobro
Kevin Grantt – bass guitar
Randy Hardison – drums, percussion, finger snaps
Aubrey Haynie – fiddle, mandolin
Wes Hightower – background vocals, vocal horns
John Hobbs – piano, keyboards
Brent Mason – electric guitar
Steve Nathan – piano, keyboards
Frank Rogers – finger snaps
Matt Rollings – piano, keyboards
Brent Rowan – electric guitar
Biff Watson – acoustic guitar
Brian David Willis – percussion
Darryl Worley – lead vocals, finger snaps
Curtis Wright – background vocals

Chart performance

Footnotes

2000 debut albums
Darryl Worley albums
DreamWorks Records albums
Albums produced by Frank Rogers (record producer)
Albums produced by James Stroud